Saint-Cloud is a commune in the western suburbs of Paris, France,  from the centre of Paris. Like other communes of Hauts-de-Seine such as Marnes-la-Coquette, Neuilly-sur-Seine and Vaucresson, Saint-Cloud is one of France's wealthiest towns, with the second-highest average household income of communities with 10,000 to 50,000 households. In 2019, it had a population of 30,012.

History 

The town is named after Clodoald, grandson of Clovis, who is supposed to have sought refuge in a hamlet on the Seine near Paris, then named Novigentum, like many other newly founded mercantile settlements outside the traditional towns. After he was canonized, the village where his tomb was located took the name of Sanctus Clodoaldus.

A park contains the ruins of the Château de Saint-Cloud, built in 1572 and destroyed by fire in 1870 during the Franco-Prussian War. The château was the residence of several French rulers and served as the main country residence of the cadet Orléans line until the French Revolution. The palace was also the site of the coup d'état led by Napoleon Bonaparte that overthrew the French Directory in 1799.

The town is also famous for the Saint-Cloud porcelain produced there from 1693 to 1766.

The Headquarters of the International Criminal Police Organization (Interpol) was at 22 Rue Armengaud from 1966 until 1989, when it moved to Lyon.

Demographics

Main sights 
The main landmarks are the park of the demolished Château de Saint-Cloud and the Pavillon de Breteuil. The Saint-Cloud Racecourse, a racetrack for Thoroughbred flat racing, was built by Edmond Blanc in 1901 and hosts a number of important races, including the annual Grand Prix de Saint-Cloud.

Tribute to Santos-Dumont 
On the Avenue de Longchamp is a bronze statue commissioned by the Airclub of France representing the Greek mythological figure Icarus, in honour of Alberto Santos-Dumont. Inaugurated on October 19, 1913, it sits on a square near the old Aerostation of Saint-Cloud, where Santos-Dumont performed his experiments with heavier-than-air aircraft. Santos-Dumont was also responsible for the construction of the world's first hangar. A replica has occupied the hangar's site in Saint-Cloud since 1952 after the original was destroyed for its bronze during the Nazi military occupation.

Transport 
Saint-Cloud is served by two stations on the Transilien La Défense and Transilien Paris-Saint-Lazare suburban rail lines: Le Val d'Or and Saint-Cloud.

The town is also served by the T2 Tramway, which runs alongside the Seine.

Central Saint-Cloud, known as le village, is also served by the metro station Boulogne-Pont de Saint-Cloud (line 10), just across the Seine on the Boulogne-Billancourt side of the Pont de Saint Cloud.

Hospital 
 René Huguenin Hospital

Education 

Public high schools:
 Lycée Alexandre-Dumas
 Lycée Santos-Dumont
It is also served by the public high school Lycée Jean Pierre Vernant in Sèvres.

Private high schools:
 Institution Saint-Pie-X

International schools:
American School of Paris
Internationale Deutsche Schule Paris (German school)

Personalities

Notable births 
 Philippe II, Duke of Orléans (1674–1723), Regent of France from 1715 to 1723
 Élisabeth Charlotte d'Orléans (1676–1744), Regent of Lorraine, lived at the Palace at Saint-Cloud
 Louis Philippe II, Duke of Orléans (1747–1793), a key figure during the early stages of the French Revolution;
 Princess Marie Bonaparte (1882–1962), psychoanalyst, closely linked with Sigmund Freud
 Gilbert Norman (1914–1944), Special Operations Executive member
 Annick Gendron, painter
 Nicole Courcel (1930–2016), film actress
 Jean-Claude Killy (born 1943), alpine skier and a triple Olympic champion
 Gérard Manset (born 1945), known as Manset, rock songwriter
 Hervé Guibert (1955–1991), writer
 Mino Cinelu (born 1957), musician
 Alexandra Fusai (born 1973), former professional tennis player
 Marie Silin (born 1979), member of parliament
 Magalie Poisson (born 1982), Olympic rhythmic gymnast
 Paul Lasne (born 1989), footballer
 Ingmar Lazar (born 1993), classical pianist, prodigy

Notable residents 
 Henri III of France (1551–1589), King of France, assassinated in Saint-Cloud
 Philippe d'Orléans (1640–1701) lived in the Château de Saint-Cloud from 1658 to his death in 1701
 Henrietta of England (1644–1670) lived and died in the Château de Saint-Cloud
 Napoléon I (1769–1821) lived in the Château de Saint-Cloud
 Antoine Sénard (1800–1885), member of the National Assembly, mayor of Saint-Cloud from 1871 to 1874
 Émile Verhaeren (1855–1916), Flemish poet
 André Chevrillon (1864–1957), French author
 Florent Schmitt (1870–1958), French composer
 Maurice Ravel (1875–1937), French composer
 Marcel Dassault (1892–1986), French businessman and politician
 Alberto Santos-Dumont (1873–1932), Brazilian inventor and aviation pioneer
 Lino Ventura (1919–1987), Italian actor, lived and died in Saint-Cloud
 Jean-Pierre Fourcade (born 1929), French Minister, mayor of Saint-Cloud from 1971 to 1992
 Christophe Dominici (1972–2020), rugby union player for France and Stade Français
 Gérard Holtz (born 1946), French sports journalist
 Jean-Marie Le Pen, French politician, owner of Domaine de Montretout in Saint-Cloud

Notable burials 
 Alimardan Topchubashov (1863–1934)
 Edmond Blanc (1856–1920)
 René Alexandre (1885–1946)
 Maurice Bessy (1910–1993), author of A Pictorial History of Magic and The Supernatural (1963)
 Gérard Blain (1930–2000)
 Gilbert Grandval (1904–1981)
 Fernand Gravey (1905–1970)
 Jean-René Huguenin (1936–1962)
 Dorothy Jordan (1761–1816)
 Vlado Perlemuter (1904–2002)
 Andrée Servilange (1911–2001)
 Jean Toulout (1887–1962)
 Maurice Yvain (1891–1965)

Twin towns – sister cities

Saint-Cloud is twinned with:

 Bad Godesberg (Bonn), Germany
 Boadilla del Monte, Spain
 Frascati, Italy
 Kortrijk, Belgium
 St. Cloud, Florida, United States
 St. Cloud, Minnesota, United States
 Windsor and Maidenhead, England, United Kingdom

In popular culture 
Saint-Cloud is the main setting of the 1955 French film Les Diaboliques (a.k.a. Diabolique).

See also 
Communes of the Hauts-de-Seine department

References

External links 

Communes of Hauts-de-Seine
Cities in Île-de-France